John George Dent (born 31 January 1903) was an English professional footballer who played for Durham City, Huddersfield Town and Nottingham Forest.

Nottingham Forest
Dent made his league debut for Nottingham Forest on 3 October 1929 at the City Ground in a 1–1 draw with Bradford Park Avenue.

He is one of only 6 players to score over 100 goals for Nottingham Forest, netting his first on 5 October 1929 away to Tottenham Hotspur. In March 1935 he scored two successive hat-tricks against Oldham Athletic and Burnley. Both matches were 5-0 victories for Forest. He scored five hat-tricks for Forest in total.

Dent's final appearance for Forest was against Leicester City at the City Ground on 19 December 1936.

References

1903 births
Year of death missing
English footballers
People from Spennymoor
Footballers from County Durham
Association football forwards
English Football League players
Huddersfield Town A.F.C. players
Nottingham Forest F.C. players
Kidderminster Harriers F.C. players
Durham City A.F.C. players